is a Japanese manga series written and illustrated by Nujima. It has been serialized on Shogakukan's Yawaraka Spirits website since October 2019. An anime television series adaptation has been announced.

Media

Manga
Written by and illustrated by Nujima, Kaii to Otome to Kamikakushi started on Shogakukan's Yawaraka Spirits website on October 18, 2019. Shogakukan has collected its chapters into individual tankōbon volumes. The first volume was released on April 10, 2020. As of January 12, 2023, five volumes have been released.

Volume list

Anime
An anime television series adaptation was announced on January 12, 2023.

Reception
In 2020, the manga was one of the nominees for the 6th Next Manga Awards in the Web Manga category.

The manga was recommended in 2021 by Akihito Tsukushi.

References

External links
 
 

2019 webcomic debuts
Anime series based on manga
Japanese webcomics
Seinen manga
Shogakukan manga
Upcoming anime television series
Webcomics in print